Mount Belolikov is a mountain (1,120 m) along the west wall of Gannutz Glacier, about 8 nautical miles (15 km) west-northwest of Mount Bruce, in the Bowers Mountains, a major mountain range situated in the geographical Victoria Land, Antarctica. The mountain was first photographed from the air by U.S. Navy Operation Highjump, 1946–47. Surveyed by Soviet Antarctic Expedition in 1958 and named after Soviet meteorologist A.M. Belolikov, who perished in a fire at Mirnyy Station on August 3, 1960. The mountain lies on the Pennell Coast, a portion of Antarctica between Cape Williams and Cape Adare.

Mountains of Victoria Land
Pennell Coast